A Post-it Note (or sticky note) is a small piece of paper with a re-adherable strip of glue on its back, made for temporarily attaching notes to documents and other surfaces. A low-tack pressure-sensitive adhesive allows the notes to be easily attached, removed and even re-posted elsewhere without leaving residue. Originally small yellow squares, Post-it Notes and related products are available in various colors, shapes, sizes and adhesive strengths. As of 2019, there are at least 26 documented colors of Post-it Notes.

Although 3M's patent expired in 1997, "Post-it" and the original notes' distinctive yellow color remain registered company trademarks, with terms such as "repositionable notes" used for similar offerings manufactured by competitors. While use of the trademark 'Post-it' in a representative sense refers to any sticky note, no legal authority has ever held the trademark to be generic.

History

In 1968, Dr. Spencer Silver, a scientist at 3M in the United States, attempted to develop a super-strong adhesive. Instead, he accidentally created a "low-tack", reusable, pressure-sensitive adhesive. For five years, Silver promoted his "solution without a problem" within 3M both informally and through seminars, but failed to gain adherents. In 1974, a colleague who had attended one of his seminars, Art Fry, came up with the idea of using the adhesive to anchor his bookmark in his hymn book. Fry then utilized 3M's sanctioned "permitted bootlegging" policy to develop the idea. The original notes' pale yellow color was chosen by chance, from the color of the scrap paper used by the lab next door to the Post-It team.

3M test marketed the product as "Press 'n Peel" bookmark in stores in four cities in 1977, but results were disappointing. A year later, 3M gave free samples to consumers in Boise, Idaho, with 94 percent of those who tried them indicating they would buy the product. The product was sold as "Post-Its" at its 1979 introduction, and was rolled out across the United States  from April 6, 1980. The following year, they were launched in Canada and Europe.

In 2003, the company introduced "Post-it Brand Super Sticky Notes", with a stronger glue that adheres better to vertical and non-smooth surfaces.
 
Until 3M's patent expired in the 1990s, Post-it type notes were produced only in the company's plant in Cynthiana, Kentucky.

In 2018, 3M launched "Post-It Extreme Notes", which are more durable and water-resistant and which stick to wood and other materials in industrial environments.

In 2010 the creators of the Post-it Note joined the National Inventors Hall of Fame as a result of the widespread success of the Post-it Note.

Competing claims
Alan Amron claimed to have been the actual inventor in 1973 who disclosed the Post-it Note technology to 3M in 1974. His 1997 suit against 3M was settled with a payment from 3M to Amron. As part of the settlement, Amron agreed not to make future claims against the company unless the settlement agreement should be breached. However, in 2016, he launched a further suit against 3M, asserting that 3M was wrongly claiming to be the inventor, and seeking $400 million in damages. At a preliminary hearing, a federal judge ordered the parties to undergo mediation. The suit was subsequently dismissed, upholding the previous 1998 settlement.

In July 2016 a former 3M marketing department employee, Daniel Dassow, stated that in 1974 Alan Amron had disclosed his Press-on memo sticky notes invention to 3M.

Uses

In workspaces and the classroom 

Post-it Notes can be uses in design teams to offer up personal ideas, assist in group activities like brainstorming, and support design thinking and design outcomes.

Post-it Notes offer a wide variety of advantages in a classroom—for instance, they are cost efficient, don't take time to set up, and are simple enough to be used by almost any age group. They have uses in concept mapping, labeling models, and more. They can also be used when explaining and teaching about broader terms like genetics.

Post-it Notes are used in the workplace both to convey information and to offer praise or words of encouragement. They can help boost communication between coworkers and can help communications between departments. They can also serve to praise people or tell them to keep up the good work.

In social media 
Satiregram, a parody account on Instagram by Euzcil Castaneto, showcases handwritten messages on Post-it Notes that describe typical pictures people would post on Instagram.

In persuasion 
As one of the top-selling consumer items on the market, Post-it Notes may have a positive effect on how users take in the information presented on them. This is backed up by research that aimed to see just how helpful these small strips of paper can be to those who utilize them.

In art 

"The Yellow Stickee Diary of a Mad Secretary", by Rosa Maria Arenas, is the mini graphic journal of an office worker/artist, exhibited July 7 through August 25, 2013, at the Michigan Institute of Contemporary Art (MICA) Gallery in Lansing, Michigan. The 41 drawings displayed are a tiny percentage of the more than 2000 original drawings that constitute the Yellow Stickee Diary Project which Arenas created while working temp jobs from 1994 to 2005. Printed with archival inks on archival paper, the reproductions include "stickee sized" (3″ × 5″) framed prints and enlargements of the original drawings (which were all done on Post-It Notes).

In 2012, Turkish artist Ardan Özmenoğlu was selected to have a solo exhibition at Bertrand Delacroix Gallery in the art district of Chelsea, Manhattan. The exhibition, titled "E Pluribus Unum" (Latin for "Out of many, one"), opened November 15, 2012 and featured large scale works on Post-It Notes.

In 2004, Paola Antonelli, a curator of architecture and design, included Post-it Notes in a show entitled "Humble Masterpieces".

Rebecca Murtaugh, a California artist, who uses Post-it Notes in her artwork, in 2001 created an installation by covering her whole bedroom with $1000 worth of the notes, using the ordinary yellow for objects she saw as having less value and neon colors for more important objects, such as the bed.

In 2000, the 20th anniversary of Post-it Notes was celebrated by having artists create artworks on the notes. One such work, by the artist R. B. Kitaj, sold for £640 in an auction, making it the most valuable Post-It Note on record.

The Lennon Wall, a message board created during the 2014 Hong Kong protests from a stretch of curved staircase in the Central Government Complex, is covered in multi-colored Post-It Notes with handwritten messages from supporters.

Software implementations
Virtual Post-It Notes have been created for computers in the form of desktop notes. These include 3M's own Post-it Brand Software Notes, Stickies in macOS, Sticky Notes in Windows, or other applications like ShixxNOTE.
Virtual Post-It–like notes are also available online using Evernote, Google Keep, or Microsoft OneNote.

In 1997, 3M sued Microsoft for trademark infringement for using the term "Post-It" in a help file.

Notes

References

External links

 Acrylate-copolymer microspheres [adhesive formula]
 Repositionable Pressure-Sensitive Adhesive Sheet Material [sheet material]
 Post-it homepage
 
 
 Post-it Note History by 3M

3M brands
American inventions
Paper products
Printing and writing paper
Products introduced in 1977
Stationery
Office equipment